Mount Torckler is a mountain 3 nautical miles (6 km) southeast of Mount Smethurst and 28 nautical miles (50 km) southwest of Stor Hanakken Mountain in Enderby Land. It was plotted from air photos taken from ANARE (Australian National Antarctic Research Expeditions) aircraft in 1957 and was named by the Antarctic Names Committee of Australia (ANCA) for R.M. Torckler, a radio officer at Wilkes Station in 1961.

See also
Mount Paish

Mountains of Enderby Land